Agustín Daniel Casanova Sommaruga (born December 14, 1993) is an Uruguayan singer and actor, known for being the vocalist of the cumbia-pop band Márama.

Biography 
He was born in 1993 in the Barrio Cordón, Montevideo. He is the son of Daniel Casanova and Lourdes, and has two sisters; Lucía and Soledad. He studied at the Colegio Nuestra Señora de Fátima and later attended the Technological School of the Buceo.

In 2014, Agustin created a cumbia pop band called Márama, in which Casanova was the vocalist. Other members of the group were Ignacio Rodríguez (Percussion), Agustín Duarte (Drums), Lautaro Moreno (Keyboard), Alejandro Vázquez (Keyboard), Matías Besson (Bass), Martín López (Guitar), Pablo Arnoletti, among others.

In 2016 he was invited to be a participant in the Argentine reality show Bailando 2016, where he participated with Josefina Oriozabala. However, he left the show at the eighth gala. In addition, in that year he was the protagonist, acting of himself, in the documentary about the Uruguayan bands Márama and Rombai, entitled Marama - Rombai - El viaje.

The following year he also participated in Bailando 2017, where he accompanied Flor Vigna and was replaced after his abandonment. In that same year the band Márama went on hiatus, and from there he was a solo singer. Later, together with former members of the group, they formed the "Team Casanova" playing the songs of that group.

In 2018, he debuted as an actor in the Argentine telenovela Simona, playing Dante Funes Guerrico. Later, Agustín made a millionaire demand to Fer Vázquez, singer and producer of Rombai and former producer of Márama. In June he released his first song in his solo career, called Ando Buscando, featuring Chyno Miranda. A month later he released his second song with Abraham Mateo and Mau and Ricky, Bailoteame. In November he released his third solo song, and the first without collaboration, Sin Regreso. On January 4, 2019, he released his fourth song, called Bye bye. And on September 5 he released his fifth song called "Tiri Tiri". In 2019, he participated in the second season of Millennials, playing Ramiro Salazar.

Since 22 June 2020, Casanova is a judge on Got Talent Uruguay, along with María Noel Ricceto, Claudia Fernández and Orlando Petinatti. In September 2021 he announced the return of Marama with the release of the single «Ya no llora».

Filmography

Film roles

Television roles

Theater roles

Discography

With Márama 

 2014: «Loquita»
 2014: «Todo comenzó bailando»
 2014: «No te vayas»
 2014: «Una noche contigo» ft. Fer Vázquez
 2014: «Bronceado»
 2015: «Nena»
 2015: «Noche Loca» ft. Rombai
 2015: «Tal vez»
 2015: «Era Tranquila»
 2016: «Te amo y odio»
 2016: «Lo intentamos»
 2016: «Te conozco» ft. Fer Vázquez
 2016: «Pasarla bien»
 2017: «Vive y disfruta»
 2017: «La quiero conocer»
 2017: «Que rico baila» ft. Rombai
2021: «Ya no llora»
2021: «No Quiero Verte» ft. Hernán y La Champions Liga
2021: «Nunca Más»
2022: «Aunque te Enamores» ft. Luciano Pereyra
2022: «Todo a la Vez»

Singles 

 2018: «Sin regreso»
 2019: «Bye Bye»
 2019: «2024»
 2018: «Tiri Tiri»

Featured in

 2018: «Ando buscando» (With Chyno Miranda)
 2018: «Bailoteame» (With Abraham Mateo and Mau & Ricky)
 2019: «Solito Solo» (With Lérica and Danny Romero)
 2019: «Picoteo» (With Dame 5)

References

External links 

 
 
 

21st-century Uruguayan male singers
21st-century Uruguayan male actors
Singers from Montevideo
1993 births
Living people
Participants in Argentine reality television series
Bailando por un Sueño (Argentine TV series) participants